A blastospore is an asexual fungal spore produced by budding. Produced by fungi within the phylum Glomeromycota and others. It is also known as a blastoconidium (plural = blastoconidia). 

An example of a fungus that forms blastospores is Candida albicans.

References
 

Fungal morphology and anatomy
Asexual reproduction